The , signed as Route 5, is one of the tolled routes of the Shuto Expressway system serving the Greater Tokyo Area. It connects Tokyo's Inner Circular Route in central Tokyo to the Tokyo Gaikan Expressway where it continues north as the Ōmiya Route.

Route description

The Ikebukuro Route begins at Takebashi Junction with the Inner Circular Route in Chiyoda City just north of the Tokyo Imperial Palace. From there it travels northwest through Shinjuku, Bunkyō, Toshima, and Itabashi in Tokyo before crossing over the Arakawa River into Toda in Saitama Prefecture where the Ikebukuro Route ends at Bijogi Junction where it intersects the Tokyo Gaikan Expressway. The expressway continues northward as the Ōmiya Route to Ōmiya-ku.

The speed limit on the Ikebukuro Route is set at 60 km/h.

History
The Ikebukuro Route was first opened in March 1967 between Nishi-kanda and the expressway's southern terminus at Takebashi Junction. It was extended to its current length in phases completed in 1969, 1977, 1990, and 1993.

In preparation for increased congestion during the 2020 Summer Olympics, a new traffic-control system was installed in July 2019 along the expressway at the interchanges at Kita-Ikebukuro, Nishi-Kanda, Gokokuji, Nakadai, Takashimadaira, Toda-minami, Higashi-Ikebukuro, and Iidabashi.

Junction list

References

5
1967 establishments in Japan
Roads in Saitama Prefecture
Roads in Tokyo